Verticordia laciniata is a flowering plant in the myrtle family, Myrtaceae and is endemic to the south-west of Western Australia. It is an openly branched shrub with linear, slightly hairy leaves and heads of scented, bright yellow flowers which turn red then bronze-coloured as they age.

Description

The staminodes are narrow, tapering and deeply divided into narrow, pointed lobes. Flowering time is from September to October.

Taxonomy and naming
Verticordia laciniata was first formally described by Alex George in 1991 from specimens collected near Walkaway and the description was published in Nuytsia. The specific epithet (laciniata) is derived from the Latin word lacinia meaning "the fringe or lappet on the border of a garment", referring to the fringed staminodes.

George placed this species in subgenus Chrysoma, section Jugata along with V. chrysanthella, V. chrysantha, V. galeata, V. brevifolia, V. coronata and V. amphigia.

Distribution and habitat
This verticordia grows in sand, loam and clay, often with other species of verticordia in heath and shrubland. It occurs in an area between Walkaway, the Coomallo Important Bird Area, Three Springs and Coorow in the Avon Wheatbelt and Geraldton Sandplains biogeographic regions.

Conservation
Verticordia laciniata is classified as "Not Threatened" by the Western Australian Government Department of Parks and Wildlife.

Use in horticulture
This verticordia is described as "a beautiful slender or bushy shrub with brilliant honey-perfumed flowers". It is difficult to propagate and only a few have been grown in gardens. It has usually been grown from cuttings and those that have been established appear to prefer a sunny position.

References

laciniata
Rosids of Western Australia
Eudicots of Western Australia
Plants described in 1991